The Magela ctenotus or Kakadu ctenotus (Ctenotus gagudju)  is a species of skink found in the Northern Territory in Australia.

References

gagudju
Reptiles described in 1986
Taxa named by Ross Allen Sadlier
Taxa named by John C. Wombey
Taxa named by Richard W. Braithwaite